Parastenolechia is a genus of moths in the family Gelechiidae.

Species
Parastenolechia acclivis  (Omelko, 1988)
Parastenolechia albicapitella  Park, 2000
Parastenolechia argobathra  (Meyrick, 1935)
Parastenolechia asymmetrica  Kanazawa, 1985
Parastenolechia claustrifera  (Meyrick, 1935)
Parastenolechia collucata  (Omelko, 1988)
Parastenolechia formosana  Kanazawa, 1991
Parastenolechia gracilis  Kanazawa, 1991
Parastenolechia issikiella  (Okada, 1961)
Parastenolechia nigrinotella  (Zeller, 1847)
Parastenolechia superba  (Omelko, 1988)
Parastenolechia suriensis  Park & Ponomarenko, 2006

References

 
Litini
Moth genera